Altefähr is a municipality in the Vorpommern-Rügen district, in Mecklenburg-Vorpommern, Germany.

Transport

 Altefähr railway station is served by local services between Rostock, Stralsund and Sassnitz.

References

External links 

Official website of Altefähr

Towns and villages on Rügen